UNIGINE is a proprietary cross-platform game engine developed by UNIGINE Company used in simulators, virtual reality systems, serious games and visualization. It supports OpenGL 4, Vulkan and DirectX 12.

UNIGINE Engine is a core technology for a lineup of benchmarks (CPU, GPU, power supply, cooling system), which are used by overclockers and technical media such as Tom's Hardware, Linus Tech Tips, PC Gamer, and JayzTwoCents. UNIGINE benchmarks are also included as part of the Phoronix Test Suite for benchmarking purposes on Linux and other systems.

UNIGINE 1 
The first public release was the 0.3 version on May 4, 2005.

Platforms
UNIGINE 1 supported Microsoft Windows, Linux, OS X, PlayStation 3, Android, and iOS. Experimental support for WebGL existed but was not included into the official SDK. UNIGINE 1 supported DirectX 9, DirectX 10, DirectX 11, OpenGL, OpenGL ES and PlayStation 3, while initial versions (v0.3x) only supported OpenGL.

UNIGINE 1 provided C++, C#, and UnigineScript APIs for developers. It also supported the shading languages GLSL and HLSL.

Serious game features 
UNIGINE 1 had support for large virtual scenarios and specific hardware required by professional simulators and enterprise VR systems, often called serious games.

Support for large virtual worlds was implemented via double precision of coordinates (64-bit per axis), zone-based background data streaming, and optional operations in geographic coordinate system (latitude, longitude, and elevation instead of X, Y, Z).

Display output was implemented via multi-channel rendering (network-synchronized image generation of a single large image with several computers), which typical for professional simulators. The same system enabled support of multiple output devices with asymmetric projections (e.g. CAVE). Curved screens with multiple projectors were also supported. UNIGINE 1 had stereoscopic output support for anaglyph rendering, separate images output, Nvidia 3D Vision, and virtual reality headsets. It also supported multi-monitor output.

Other features

UNIGINE rendered supported Shader model 5.0 with hardware tessellation, DirectCompute, and OpenCL. It also used screen space ambient occlusion and real-time global illumination. UNIGINE used a proprietary physics engine to process events such as collision detection, rigid body physics, and dynamical destruction of objects. It also used a proprietary engine for path finding and basic AI components. UNIGINE had features such as interactive 3D GUI, video playback using Theora codec, 3D audio system based on OpenAL library, WYSIWYG scene editor (UNIGINE Editor).

UNIGINE 2 
UNIGINE 2 was released on October 10, 2015.

UNIGINE 2 has all features from UNIGINE 1 and transitioned from forward rendering to deferred rendering approach, PBR shading, and introduced new graphical technologies like geometry water, multi-layered volumetric clouds, SSRTGI and voxel-based lighting.

Platforms
UNIGINE 2 supports Microsoft Windows, Linux and OS X (support stopped starting from 2.6 version).

UNIGINE 2 supports the following graphical APIs: DirectX 11, OpenGL 4.x. Since version 2.16 UNIGINE experimentally supports DirectX 12 and Vulkan.

There are 3 APIs for developers: C++, C#, Unigine Script.

Supported Shader languages: HLSL, GLSL, UUSL (Unified UNIGINE Shader Language).

SSRTGI
Proprietary SSRTGI (Screen Space Ray-Traced Global Illumination) rendering technology was introduced in version 2.5. It was presented at SIGGRAPH 2017 Real-Time Live! event.

Development 
The roots of UNIGINE are in the frustum.org open source project, which was initiated in 2002 by Alexander "Frustum" Zaprjagaev, who is a co-founder (along with Denis Shergin, CEO) and ex-CTO of UNIGINE Company.

Linux game competition 
On November 25, 2010, UNIGINE Company announced a competition to support Linux game development. They agreed to give away a free license of the UNIGINE engine to anyone willing to develop and release a game with a Linux native client, and would also grant the team a Windows license. The competition ran until December 10, 2010, with a considerable number of entries being submitted. Due to the unexpected response, UNIGINE decided to extend the offer to the three best applicants, with each getting full UNIGINE licenses. The winners were announced on December 13, 2010, with the developers selected being Kot-in-Action Creative Artel (who previously developed Steel Storm), Gamepulp (who intend to make a puzzle platform), and MED-ART (who previously worked on Painkiller: Resurrection).

UNIGINE-based projects 
As of 2021 company claimed to have more than 250 B2B customers worldwide.

Some companies that develop software for professional aircraft, ships & vehicle simulators use UNIGINE Engine as a base for the 3D & VR visualization.

Games 
Released

 Cradle - released for Windows and Linux in 2015
Oil Rush - released for Windows, Linux and Mac OS X in 2012; released for iOS in 2013
Syndicates of Arkon - released for Windows in 2010
Tryst - released for Windows in 2012
Petshop - released for Windows and Mac in 2011
Sumoman - released for Windows and Linux in 2017
Demolicious - released for iOS in 2012
  Dual Universe - released in 2022

Upcoming
 Dilogus: The Winds of War
 Node - VR shooter (Steam page)
 Kingdom of Kore - action RPG for PC (in future for PS3) - cancelled by publisher
 El Somni Quas - MMORPG (Patreon page)
 Acro FS - aerobatic flight simulator (Steam page)

Simulation and visualization 
 Metro Simulator by Smart Simulation
 CarMaker 10.0 by IPG Automotive
 NAUTIS maritime simulators by VSTEP
 Train driver simulator by Oktal Sydac
 Be-200 flight simulator
 Klee 3D (3D visualization solution for digital marketing and research applications)
 The visualization component of the analytical software complex developed for JSC "ALMAZ-ANTEY" MSDB", an affiliate of JSC "Concern "Almaz-Antey"
 Real-time interactive architectural visualization projects of AI3D
 Bell-206 Ranger rescue helicopter simulator
 Magus ex Machina (3D animated movie)
 SIMREX CDS, SIMREX FDS, SIMREX FTS car driving simulators by INNOSIMULATION
 Real-time artworks by John Gerrard (artist): Farm, Solar Reserve, Exercise,  Western Flag (Spindletop, Texas), X. laevis (Spacelab)
 Train simulators by SPECTR
 DVS3D by GDI
 RF-X flight simulator
 NAVANTIS Ship Simulator
 VR simulator for learning of computer vision for autonomous flight control at Daedalean AI

Benchmarks 
UNIGINE Engine is used as a platform for a series of benchmarks, which can be used to determine the stability of PC hardware (CPU, GPU, power supply, cooling system) under extremely stressful conditions, as well as for overclocking:
 Superposition Benchmark (featuring online leaderboards) - UNIGINE 2 (2017)
 Valley Benchmark - UNIGINE 1 (2013)
 Heaven Benchmark (the first DirectX 11 benchmark) - UNIGINE 1 (2009)
 Tropics Benchmark - UNIGINE 1 (2008)
 Sanctuary Benchmark - UNIGINE 1 (2007)

See also
 List of game engines
 List of game middleware
 Game physics
 3D computer graphics

References

External links 
 

Computer physics engines
Game engines for Linux
Middleware
Unigine SDK
Software that uses Qt
Video game development
Video game development software
Video game development software for Linux
Video game engines
Video game IDE
Virtual reality